Alabama v. Bozeman, 533 U.S. 146 (2001), was a United States Supreme Court decision involving the prosecution of someone who was already serving a criminal sentence for a different crime in a different state.

Background 
In circumstances where a state wants to get a person for prosecution who is held in another state, they would file a detainer. That is a legal document telling the other state where the person is imprisoned and to produce him for trial later on in the prosecuting state. An interstate compact, which was joined by the Federal Government among almost all other states, set forth procedures as to how this process was to be done. The case concerned a specific provision which says that once the prisoner arrives in the receiving state, he must be tried within 120 days. Otherwise, the case must be dismissed. The federal government sent Michael Bozeman to Alabama to face charges there. After court preliminaries, the next day he was returned to federal prison and then brought back to Alabama for trial. The trial judge rejected a petition to dismiss the charges for a violation of the Interstate Compact and a divided Alabama Supreme Court reversed.

Opinion of the Court 
Justice Breyer explained the question as a simple issue of the exact language in the statute. He noted that it says that in circumstances like the present case, the indictment shall not be of any further force and it should be dismissed. Against pleas by Alabama that the question was technical and the violation small, Breyer replied that "[E]ven were we to assume for argument's sake that the Agreement exempts violations that...are de minimis...we could not say that the violation at issue here qualifies as trivial." The decision of the Alabama Supreme Court was affirmed, mandating a dismissal of the indictment against Bozeman in Alabama.

See also 
 Interstate compact

References

External links 

United States Supreme Court cases
2001 in United States case law
2001 in Alabama
Legal history of Alabama
United States Supreme Court cases of the Rehnquist Court
United States criminal procedure case law